Amara blanchardi is a species of beetle of the genus Amara in the family Carabidae. It is native to North America.

References

blanchardi
Beetles described in 1908